Jalil, Jahlil, Jaleel, Calil, Callil, Celil may refer to:

People
Jalil Andrabi (died 1996), Kashmiri victim of Jalil Andrabi murder case
Caetano Calil (born 1984), Brazilian footballer
Carmen Callil (1938–2022), Australian publisher in the UK
Ely Calil (1945–2018), Lebanese-Nigerian-British businessman
George Calil (born 1973), British actor
George Calil (businessman) (died 1967), Levantine-Nigerian businessman
Huseyincan Celil (born 1969), Uyghur imam of Chinese and Canadian citizenship, accused of terrorism
Musa Cälil (1906–1944), Soviet Tatar poet and anti-Nazi fighter
Ordîxanê Celîl (1932–2007), Kurdish writer
Khalil Jalil Hamza (died 2007), Iraqi politician
Jalil Hutchins, vocalist and lyricist with Whodini
Ali Jaleel (1979–2009), Maldivian alleged terrorist
Moosa Ali Jaleel (born 1960), Maldivian army officer
Muzamil Jaleel (born 1972), Indian journalist
Abdul Jalil (disambiguation)
Ananta Jalil (born 1978), Bangladeshi actor, director, producer and industrialist
Jalile Jalil (born 1936), Kurdish historian
Jannat Jalil, BBC newsreader
Javeria Jalil (born c. 1972), Pakistani actress
Nasreen Jalil (born 1947), Pakistani politician
Qanita Jalil (born 1982), Pakistani cricketer
Tábata Jalil (born 1979), Mexican TV-hostess from TV Azteca
Jaleel Johnson (born 1994), American football player
Jalil Lespert (born 1976), French actor, screenwriter and director
Jalil Mammadguluzadeh (1866–1932), Azerbaijani satirist and writer
Djalil Narjissi (born 1980), Moroccan Rugby footballer
Jalil Rasouli (born 1947), Iranian artist
Jaleel Scott (born 1995), American football player
Jalil Shahnaz (1921–2013), Iranian musician and tar player
Jalil Shihab (born 1927), Iraqi footballer
Jalil Shihab (born 1927), Iraqi footballer
Jaleel White (born 1976), American actor
Jalil Zaland (c. 1935–2009), Afghan poet, composer and singer
Jalil Ziapour (1920–1999), Iranian painter

Places
Jalil, Iran, a village in Kohgiluyeh and Boyer-Ahmad Province, Iran
Bukit Jalil, a suburb of Kuala Lumpur, Malaysia
Puncak Jalil, a township in Selangor, Malaysia
Oum El Djalil, a town in Algeria
Galilee (romanized al-Jalīl), a region in Israel

Other
al-Jalil, "The Majestic", a name of God in Islam
S. M. Jaleel and Company, a Trinidadian drinks company
Jalil (horse), an American racehorse

See also
 
 
Jalili
Jalal, a given name and surname
Djalil (disambiguation)
Dzhalil (disambiguation)